Kiss Each Other Clean is the fourth studio album by Iron & Wine, released January 25, 2011 via 4AD (worldwide) and Warner Bros. in the US. The album's title is taken from the lyrics of "Your Fake Name Is Good Enough for Me".

The first track from the album, "Walking Far from Home," was released on November 26 in CD single and 12" vinyl versions as part of a special Record Store Day Black Friday event. The digital download version was released on November 30. The song "Tree by the River" has also been released, for free download, on Iron & Wine's website. On January 5, Iron & Wine performed all but one song from Kiss Each Other Clean live at the Greene Space in New York City for a live broadcast on NPR's website.

The album marks a further change in style – in an interview with Spin, Beam said “It’s more of a focused pop record. It sounds like the music people heard in their parent’s car growing up… that early-to-mid-’70s AM, radio-friendly music."

In 2017 it was ranked number 65 in Paste magazine's "The 100 Best Indie Folk Albums" list.

Track listing
All songs written by Sam Beam.
Standard Edition
 "Walking Far from Home" – 4:47
 "Me and Lazarus" – 3:03
 "Tree by the River" – 3:58
 "Monkeys Uptown" – 3:48
 "Half Moon" – 3:16
 "Rabbit Will Run" – 5:30
 "Godless Brother in Love" – 3:50
 "Big Burned Hand" – 4:12
 "Glad Man Singing" – 4:40
 "Your Fake Name Is Good Enough for Me" – 7:01

iTunes Deluxe Version Bonus Tracks
"Black Candle" – 3:38
 "Lean into the Light" – 4:07

Chart positions

References

2011 albums
Iron & Wine albums
4AD albums
Warner Records albums